Sheakleyville is a borough in northern Mercer County, Pennsylvania, United States. The population was 142 at the 2010 census, a figure which increased to 150 tabulated residents in 2020. It is part of the Youngstown–Warren metropolitan area.

Geography
Sheakleyville is located at  (41.443244, -80.207305).

Demographics

As of the census of 2000, there were 164 people, 65 households, and 49 families residing in the borough. The population density was 1,023.0 people per square mile (395.8/km2). There were 71 housing units at an average density of 442.9 per square mile (171.3/km2). The racial makeup of the borough was 98.17% White, 0.61% Native American, and 1.22% from two or more races. 29.6% were of German, 22.6% American, 15.7% English and 9.6% Dutch ancestry according to Census 2000.

There were 65 households, out of which 33.8% had children under the age of 18 living with them, 67.7% were married couples living together, 6.2% had a female householder with no husband present, and 23.1% were non-families. 20.0% of all households were made up of individuals, and 12.3% had someone living alone who was 65 years of age or older. The average household size was 2.52 and the average family size was 2.92.

In the borough the population was spread out, with 21.3% under the age of 18, 8.5% from 18 to 24, 28.0% from 25 to 44, 26.8% from 45 to 64, and 15.2% who were 65 years of age or older. The median age was 40 years. For every 100 females there were 105.0 males. For every 100 females age 18 and over, there were 92.5 males.

The median income for a household in the borough was $28,750, and the median income for a family was $38,750. Males had a median income of $32,813 versus $22,083 for females. The per capita income for the borough was $15,479. About 4.1% of families and 9.5% of the population were below the poverty line, including 16.2% of those under the age of eighteen and 18.8% of those sixty five or over.

References

Populated places established in 1820
1820 establishments in Pennsylvania
Boroughs in Mercer County, Pennsylvania